Ravigasen Ranganathan "Ravi" Pillay (born 18 November 1958) is a South African attorney and African National Congress (ANC) politician who served as the Member of the Executive Council for Economic Development, Tourism and Environmental Affairs in the KwaZulu-Natal Provincial Government  from November 2020 until August 2022. He was the MEC for Finance from May 2019 to November 2020 and the MEC for Human Settlements and Public Works from 2011 to 2019. Pillay was elected to the KwaZulu-Natal Legislature in 2009 and served as the legislature's chief whip of the majority party from 2009 to 2011.

Early life and education
Pillay was born on 18 November 1958 in Port Shepstone in the Natal Province. He studied at the University of Durban-Westville and obtained both a BA degree and an LLB degree. He was a student activist at the university and joined the ANC in 1981.

Political career
After apartheid, Pillay became the inaugural speaker of the Hibiscus Coast Local Municipality and was later promoted to be speaker of the Ugu District Municipality.

Pillay was elected as an MPL in May 2009. He was then appointed the chief whip of the ANC caucus in the legislature. Later, in November 2011, he was appointed as the MEC for Human Settlements and Public Works. He served in the post under three premiers from 2011 to 2019: Zweli Mkhize, Senzo Mchunu and Willies Mchunu.

Pillay was appointed acting premier in March 2018, becoming the first Indian South African to hold the post. He had since been acting premier on multiple occasions.

In May 2019, Pillay became the MEC for Finance in the cabinet of Sihle Zikalala. He  took over from Belinda Scott, who left the provincial government. Pillay was appointed as the MEC for Economic Development, Tourism and Environmental Affairs in November 2020, replacing Nomusa Dube-Ncube.

On 9 August 2022, Pillay resigned from the provincial government and the provincial legislature.

References

External links
Hon. RR Pillay – KwaZulu-Natal Legislature
Ravigasen Ranganathan Pillay – People's Assembly

|-

|-

Living people
1958 births
Members of the KwaZulu-Natal Legislature
People from KwaZulu-Natal
South African politicians of Indian descent
African National Congress politicians
University of Durban-Westville alumni
People from Port Shepstone
People from Ugu District Municipality
People from Hibiscus Coast Local Municipality
20th-century South African politicians
21st-century South African politicians